Kenny Griffin (January 27, 1912 – September 26, 2002) was an American gymnast. He competed in eight events at the 1936 Summer Olympics.

References

1912 births
2002 deaths
American male artistic gymnasts
Olympic gymnasts of the United States
Gymnasts at the 1936 Summer Olympics
Sportspeople from Logan, Utah